Ackleton is a village in the English county of Shropshire. It is in the civil parish of Worfield.

Situated some seven miles (11 kilometers) from the market town of Bridgnorth, this village is the home of the two pub and restaurants The Red Cow and The Folley. Convenient for both Wolverhampton and Telford, this rural retreat is surrounded by open fields and views. It also shares its territory with Badger Dingle, which is a forest area often visited by walkers and hikers. Ackleton is most situated by small quaint cottages. The open fields are great for walking or hiking. The area attracts many dog walkers.

The architecture for the housing in Ackleton dates back to Tudor times.

Ackleton is believed to have inspired the fictional village of Eckleton in writings of P.G.Wodehouse, whose parents lived in nearby Stableford.

See also
Listed buildings in Worfield

References

External links

Villages in Shropshire